The Labor Temple Building is a historic structure located at 743 4th Avenue in San Diego's Gaslamp Quarter, in the U.S. state of California. It was built in 1907. Currently, the building's tenant is a Cuban cigar shop and hookah lounge.

See also
 List of Gaslamp Quarter historic buildings

References

External links

 

1907 establishments in California
Buildings and structures completed in 1907
Buildings and structures in San Diego
Gaslamp Quarter, San Diego
Trade union buildings in the United States